Our Generation is the debut studio album by British classical musician Tokio Myers. It was released on 17 November 2017 through Syco Music and features contributions from Ed Sheeran, J'Danna, Latir, Meave, Vera Hall, Guy Farley, Craigie Dodds, Hugh Fothergill and Alex Hepburn.

Track listing
Note: All tracks are produced by Tokio Myers, Craigie Dodds and Guy Farley

Notes
 Track 2 features uncredited vocals from J'Danna.
 Track 3 features uncredited backing vocals from Ed Sheeran.
 Track 3 covers the songs "Bloodstream" by Ed Sheeran and "Clair de Lune" by Claude Debussy.
 Track 4 featured uncredited vocals from Latir and Meave.
 Track 4 covers the song "Angel" by The Weeknd, featuring Maty Noyes.
 Track 6 samples uncredited vocals from Vera Hall.
 Track 6 samples the song "Death, Have Mercy" by Vera Hall.
 Track 7 features uncredited vocals from Latir.
 Track 9 features uncredited vocals from Meave.
 Track 9 covers the song "Children" by Robert Miles.
 Track 12 features uncredited backing vocals from Tokio Myers, Craigie Dodds, Guy Farley and Hugh Fothergill.
 Track 13 features uncredited vocals from Alex Hepburn.

Charts

Weekly charts

Year-end charts

Certifications

References

2017 debut albums
Syco Music albums